On 1 January 2022, 12 people were killed and 16 others injured during a stampede near to Gate No. 3 at the Vaishno Devi Temple in Katra, Jammu and Kashmir, northern India.

Stampede 
Hundreds of people were packed inside the Vaishno Devi Temple corridor to offer prayers shortly after midnight to start the first day of the new year of 2022. Outside the temple, the roads leading to it were packed with people, with an eyewitness claiming there was hardly room to walk. Around 2:30 am many recall hearing a large commotion before the stampede.

An eyewitness claimed to have fallen with about two dozen people after watching a large crowd leave the temple and those behind them surged forward, and felt that he was going to die as people continue to move over those who had died. Another recounted that they had fallen due to people pushing them near a pathway at the shrine, with another eyewitness claiming that the crowd suddenly turned aggressive and created a stampede.

Investigation 
The government launched an investigation into the stampede. A three-member inquiry panel, headed by Principal Secretary Shaleen Jabra was created and tasked with completing a report within a week from the stampede. An announcement was issued to the public, inviting any information or documentation about the stampede be brought forward for investigators via email, phone or Whatsapp message or by appearing before the Enquiry Committee.

Response 
Prime Minister Narendra Modi stated that he was "saddened" by the loss of life.

References

2022 disasters in India
2020s in Jammu and Kashmir
Disasters in Jammu and Kashmir
Human stampedes in 2022
Human stampedes in India
January 2022 events in India